Eduard Säkk (1 February 1875 Narva – 12 October 1943 Novosibirsk Oblast, Russia) was an Estonian engineer, industrialist and politician. He was a member of Asutav Kogu.

Säkk was a member of the Estonian Constituent Assembly, Minister of Roads from 27 November 1918 until 8 May 1919, and again from 18 November 1919 to 30 July 1920. Following the Soviet occupation of Estonia in 1940, Säkk was arrested by the NKVD on 19 October 1940 in Nõmme and died in a prison camp in Russia.

References

1875 births
1943 deaths
Estonian engineers
Estonian Labour Party politicians
Members of the Estonian Constituent Assembly
Government ministers of Estonia
Estonian people who died in Soviet detention
People who died in the Gulag
People from Narva
Politicians from Narva